Mina Nawe is the fifteenth studio album by South African singer Brenda Fassie. The record was released on November 2, 2001, by CCP Records. Fassie wrote most of the album's songs with Sello Chicco Twala.

Originally released by CCP Records, the album was reissued on CD in 2002, EMI in 2009 re-released the album in its digital form. The album was also the best-selling album of 2001, according to the Recording Industry of South Africa (RISA).The album sold over 350 000 copies in South Africa in 2002.

Commercial performance
The album sold over 350 000 units in South Africa, with Mina Nawe becoming the best-selling album of 2001, and was certified platinum by the Recording Industry of South Africa (RISA).

Accolades
Among its accolades, it won Best Selling Release at the 8th South African Music Awards (SAMA), with Fassie becoming the first female artist to win in the category three times.

SAMA

Track listing
Credits adapted from All Music.

Certifications

Personnel
Brenda Fassie - Musician, producer, writer (track 1-9)
Sello Chicco Twala - Engineer, Instruments, producer 
Melvyn Matthews - writer (track 10)
Mally Watson - producer (track 10)
Dumisani Ngubeni - writer (track 10)
Longwe Twala - Instrument (track 1,2,4 & 7,9)

References

External links 
 

Brenda Fassie albums
2001 albums